Jeane may refer to:

"Jeane" (song), by the English band The Smiths
 Jeane Daniel Gunder (1888–1948), American entomologist
 Jeane Dixon (1904–1997), American astrologer and psychic
 Jeane Freeman (born 1953), Scottish National Party politician
 Jeane Gardiner (died 1651), alleged British witch
 Jeane Kirkpatrick (1926–2006), American diplomat 
Jeane, a character from the video game series Suikoden
Jeane, a character from the video game No More Heroes

See also
Jeanne (disambiguation)